Below follows a List of the active units of the Portuguese Army sorted by corps and with their subunits and locations:

Infantry 
 1st Infantry Regiment (Regimento de Infantaria nº 1) in Beja
 Command and Service Company (Supply & Services Platoon, Garrison & Security Platoon, Transport & Maintenance Section, CIS Section, Medical Section)
 Training Company
 Tavira Detachment (Supply & Services Platoon, Garrison & Security Platoon, Transport & Maintenance Section, CIS Section, Medical Section)
 10th Infantry Regiment (Regimento de Infantaria nº 10) in Aveiro
 Command and Service Company (General Services Platoon, Garrison & Security Platoon, Transport & Supply Platoon, Maintenance Section, CIS Section, Medical Section)
 2nd Parachute Infantry Battalion for the Rapid Reaction Brigade
 Parachute Command and Support Company
 21st Parachute Infantry Company
 22nd Parachute Infantry Company
 23rd Parachute Infantry Company
 13th Infantry Regiment (Regimento de Infantaria nº 13) in Vila Real
 Command and Service Company (General Services Platoon, Garrison & Security Platoon, Transport & Supply Platoon, Maintenance Section, CIS Section, Medical Section)
 1st Mechanized Infantry Battalion for the Intervention Brigade
 Command and Support Company
 3x Mechanized Rifles Companies with Pandur II armored personnel carriers
 Combat Support Company with anti-tank missiles and mortars
 14th Infantry Regiment (Regimento de Infantaria nº 14) in Viseu
 Command and Service Company (General Services Platoon, Garrison & Security Platoon, Transport & Supply Platoon, Maintenance Section, CIS Section, Medical Section)
 2nd Mechanized Infantry Battalion for the Intervention Brigade
 Command and Support Company
 3x Mechanized Rifles Companies with Pandur II armored personnel carriers
 Combat Support Company with anti-tank missiles and mortars
 15th Infantry Regiment (Regimento de Infantaria nº 15) in Tomar
 Command and Service Company (General Services Platoon, Garrison & Security Platoon, Transport & Supply Platoon, Maintenance Section, CIS Section, Medical Section)
 1st Parachute Infantry Battalion for the Rapid Reaction Brigade
 Parachute Command and Support Company
 11th Parachute Infantry Company
 12th Parachute Infantry Company
 13th Parachute Infantry Company
 19th Infantry Regiment (Regimento de Infantaria nº 19) in Chaves
 Command and Service Company (General Services Platoon, Garrison & Security Platoon, Transport & Supply Platoon, Maintenance Section, CIS Section, Medical Section)
 Service Support Battalion for the Intervention Brigade
 Commando Regiment in Belas
 Command and Service Company
 Training Company
 Commando Battalion for the Rapid Reaction Brigade
 Command and Support Company
 3x Commando Companies
 Paratroopers Regiment in Tancos
 Command and Service Company
 Training Battalion
 Terrestrial Training Company
 Aeroterrestrial Training Company
 Aeroterrestrial Operations Battalion for the Rapid Reaction Brigade
 Pathfinder Company
 Aerial Equipment Company
 Aerial Supply Company
 Service Company
 Special Operations Troops Centre in Lamego
 Command and Service Company
 Training Company
 Special Operations Forces for the Rapid Reaction Brigade

Cavalry 
 2nd Lancers Regiment (Regimento de Lanceiros nº 2) in Amadora
 Command and Service Group
 Command Squadron (CIS Centre, Garrison & Security Platoon, CIS Section, Information Security Section, Information Systems Section)
 Service Squadron (Supply & Services Platoon, Maintenance & Transport Section, Depot Section)
 Military Police Group
 Support Platoon (Supply Section, CIS Section, Medical Section, Maintenance Section, Motorbike Section)
 2x Military Police Squadrons
 3rd Cavalry Regiment (Regimento de Cavalaria nº 3) in Estremoz
 Command and Support Squadron (Logistic Section, CIS Section)
 Reconnaissance Group
 Command and Service Squadron (Maintenance & Transport Platoon, Signal Platoon, Medical Platoon)
 Reconnaissance Squadron for the Rapid Reaction Brigade
 Training Squadron
 6th Cavalry Regiment (Regimento de Cavalaria nº 6) in Braga
 Command and Service Squadron (General Services Platoon, Garrison & Security Platoon, Maintenance & Transport Section, CIS Section)
 Reconnaissance Group
 Command and Support Squadron (Maintenance & Transport Platoon, Signal Platoon, Medical Platoon)
 Reconnaissance Squadron for the Intervention Brigade with Véhicule Blindé Léger
 Reconnaissance Squadron (General Support)
 Fire Support Squadron for the Intervention Brigade with Commando V150 armored vehicles
 Support Squadron (Anti-tank missile Platoon, Heavy Mortar Platoon, Battlefield Surveillance Section, UAV Section)

Artillery 
 1st Anti-Aircraft Artillery Regiment (Regimento de Artilharia Antiaérea nº 1) in Queluz
 Command and Service Battery (General Services Platoon, Garrison & Security Platoon, Transport & Supply Platoon, CIS Section, Medical Section)
 Anti-Aircraft Artillery Group
 Command and Support Battery
 Anti-Aircraft Artillery Battery (General Support) with Stinger surface-to-air missiles
 Anti-Aircraft Artillery Battery for the Intervention Brigade with Stinger surface-to-air missiles
 Anti-Aircraft Artillery Battery for the Rapid Reaction Brigade with Stinger surface-to-air missiles
 HIMAD Battery with MIM-72A3 Chaparral surface-to-air missiles
 Radar Section with PSTAR radars
 4th Artillery Regiment (Regimento de Artilharia nº 4) in Leiria
 Command and Service Battery (General Services Platoon, Garrison & Security Platoon, Transport & Supply Platoon, CIS Section, Medical Section, Maintenance Section)
 Field Artillery Group for the Rapid Reaction Brigade
 Command and Support Battery (Target Acquisition Platoon, Transport & Supply Platoon, Maintenance Platoon, Signal Platoon, Medical Section)
 3x Fires Batteries with L118 105mm howitzers
 1x Heavy Mortar Battery with Tampella 120mm mortars
 5th Artillery Regiment (Regimento de Artilharia nº 5) in Vendas Novas
 Command and Service Battery (General Services Platoon, Garrison & Security Platoon, Transport & Supply Platoon, CIS Section, Medical Section, Maintenance Section)
 Field Artillery Group for the Intervention Brigade
 Command and Support Battery (Target Acquisition Platoon, Transport & Supply Platoon, Maintenance Platoon, Signal Platoon, Medical Section)
 2x Fires Batteries with M114 155mm howitzers

Engineers 
 1st Engineer Regiment (Regimento de Engenharia nº 1) in Tancos
 Command and Service Company (General Services Platoon, Garrison & Security Platoon, Transport & Supply Platoon, CIS Section, Medical Section)
 Engineer Battalion
 Command and Support Company
 1st Engineer Company (General Support)
 Engineer Company for the Rapid Reaction Brigade
 CBRN defense Company
 Bridging Company
 EOD Group
 3rd Engineer Regiment (Regimento de Engenharia nº 3) in Espinho
 Command and Service Company (General Services Platoon, Garrison & Security Platoon, Transport & Supply Platoon, CIS Section, Medical Section)
 Engineer Battalion
 Command and Support Company
 Engineer Company for the Intervention Brigade
 2nd Engineer Company (General Support)

Garrison regiments 

 1st Garrison Regiment (Regimento de Guarnição nº 1) in Angra do Heroismo
 Command and Service Company
 1st Infantry Battalion
 Command & Support Company
 1st Rifle Company
 2nd Rifle Company
 2nd Garrison Regiment (Regimento de Guarnição nº 2) in Ponta Delgada
 Command and Service Company
 Training Company
 Anti-Aircraft Artillery Battery with Rh 202 20mm twin mounted anti-aircraft guns
 2nd Infantry Battalion
 Command & Support Company
 1st Rifle Company
 2nd Rifle Company
 Combat Support Company
 3rd Garrison Regiment (Regimento de Guarnição nº 3) in Funchal
 Command and Service Company
 Training Company
 Anti-Aircraft Artillery Battery with Rh 202 20mm twin mounted anti-aircraft guns
 Infantry Battalion
 Command & Support Company
 1st Rifle Company

Other units 
 Army Light Aviation Unit in Tancos
 Army Helicopter Group for the Rapid Reaction Brigade
 Command and Service Company for the Rapid Reaction Brigade
 Signal Company for the Rapid Reaction Brigade
 Support Unit
 Command Squadron
 Service Squadron
 Airbase Support Squadron
 Signal Regiment (Regimento de Transmissões) in Porto
 Command and Service Company (Supply & Services Platoon, Garrison & Security Platoon, Maintenance & Transport Section, CIS Section, Medical Section)
 CIS Detachment North (CIS Section, Information Security Section, Equipment Section)
 Electronic Warfare Training Center
 Electronic Warfare Company
 Signal Battalion
 Signal Company for the Intervention Brigade
 Signal Company (General Support)
 Maintenance Regiment (Regimento de Manutenção) in Entroncamento
 Command and Service Company (General Services Platoon, Garrison & Security Platoon, Transport & Supply Platoon, CIS Section, Medical Section)
 Training Company
 Maintenance Battalion
 Maintenance Company for the Intervention Brigade
 Maintenance Company for the Rapid Reaction Brigade
 Maintenance Company (General Support)
 Materiel Inspection Platoon
 Transport Regiment (Regimento de Transportes) in Lisbon
 Command and Service Company (General Services Platoon, Garrison & Security Platoon, Transport & Supply Platoon, CIS Section, Medical Section)
 Transport Battalion
 Transport Company
 Personnel Transport Company
 Movement Control Platoon

Mechanized Brigade 
The Mechanized Brigade differs from the army's other two brigades as its units aren't provided by regiments. All units of the Mechanized Brigade are part of the Mechanized Brigade at all times and are all based at the Santa Margarida Camp. The following units are part of the Mechanized Brigade:
 Mechanized Brigade in Santa Margarida
 Command and Service Company
 Tank Group with two squadrons of Leopard 2A6
 1st Mechanized Infantry Battalion with M113 armored personnel carrier
 2nd Mechanized Infantry Battalion with M113 armored personnel carrier
 Field Artillery Group with M109A5 155mm self-propelled howitzers
 Reconnaissance Squadron
 Anti-Aircraft Artillery Battery with MIM-72A3 Chaparral surface-to-air missiles
 Engineer Company
 Signal Company
 Service Support Battalion

References 

Portuguese Army
Army
Portuguese Army